Geetiara Shafia Choudhury is a Bangladeshi Business Woman and former Advisor of Caretaker Government led by Fakhruddin Ahmed. She is the Chairperson of ADCOMM.

Career
In 1978 she became the first female member of the Dhaka Club. She was an advisor of Caretaker Government led by Fakhruddin Ahmed. She was in charge of the Ministry of Industry, Ministry of Textiles and jute, Ministry of Social Welfare, Ministry of Women and Children Affairs.

Personal life
She is married to Nazim Kamran Choudhury, a former member of Parliament.

References

Living people
Advisors of Caretaker Government of Bangladesh
Year of birth missing (living people)